Eduardo Cohen (1890 – 1963) was a Portuguese philatelist who was added to the Roll of Distinguished Philatelists in 1959.

References

Signatories to the Roll of Distinguished Philatelists
1890 births
1963 deaths
Portuguese philatelists